This list deals with Australian rules football rivalries in Australia and around the world. This includes club teams, which compete in local derbies as well as matches between club teams further afield. Also lists international rivalries and rivalries between individual players.

Individuals

Rivalries between players

Rivalries between coaches

International
Canada–United States (49th Parallel Cup)

Australia

Interstate 
 South Australia–Victoria
 South Australia–Western Australia
 Victoria–Western Australia

Australian Football League

Local AFL derbies 
 West Coast v Fremantle
 Adelaide v Port Adelaide
 Brisbane Lions v Gold Coast
 Sydney v Greater Western Sydney

Victorian Football League rivalries 
 Carlton v Collingwood
 Essendon v Carlton
 Melbourne v Collingwood
 Richmond v Collingwood
 Hawthorn v Essendon
 Richmond v Carlton
 Essendon v Collingwood
 Essendon v Richmond
 North Melbourne v Hawthorn
 Hawthorn v Geelong
 Essendon v North Melbourne
 Collingwood v Geelong
 Geelong v Richmond
 Fitzroy v Collingwood 
 South Melbourne v St Kilda

Interstate rivalries 
 Western Bulldogs v Greater Western Sydney

Recent rivalries 
 Collingwood v West Coast
 West Coast v Sydney
 Brisbane Lions v Collingwood
 Collingwood v Port Adelaide
 Fremantle v Carlton
 Hawthorn v Sydney

South Australian National Football League 
 Norwood–Port Adelaide (main article: Port Adelaide–Norwood)
 Port Adelaide–Sturt
 North Adelaide–Glenelg

West Australian Football League 
 East Fremantle–South Fremantle (Fremantle Derby)

Northern Territory Football League 
 St Mary's–Darwin

Victorian Football Association 
 Williamstown–Port Melbourne

Tallangatta Football League 
 Beechworth–Chiltern
 Kiewa-Sandy Creek–Mitta United

United States 
 New York–Boston

References 

Australian rules football rivalries
Rivalries